Alexandru Muşina  (July 1, 1954 in Sibiu – June 19, 2013 in Brasov) was a Romanian poet, essayist, and editor born in Sibiu.

He studied literature at the University of Bucharest in the late 1970s and published poetry in the 1980s beginning with Cinci in 1982.

He obtained a doctorate in literature from the University of Bucharest in 1996.

Selected works
Poems: 
 Armasarul si papusia
 Political Congo
 Reclam

Poems
Poems:
Cinci, la Editura "Litera", în 1982,
Strada Castelului 104,Editura "C.R.", 1984
Lucrurile pe care le-am văzut (1979–1986), Ed. "C.R.", 1992 (poezie);
Aleea Mimozei nr. 3, Ed. "Pontica", 1993 (poezie);
Tomografia şi alte explorări, Ed. "Marineasa", 1994 (poezie);
Album duminical, Biblioteca "Poesis", 1994 (poezie)
Budila-Express, Ed. "Cresphis", Paris, 1995 (poezie);
Tea, Ed. "Axa", 1997 (poezie);
Şi animalele sunt oameni!, Ed. "Aula", 2000 (poezii pentru copii);
Personae, Ed. "Aula", 2001 (poezie);
Hinterland, Ed. "Aula", 2003 (poezie);
Poeme alese (1975–2001), Ed. "Aula", 2003 (poezie);

Essays
Essays:
Unde se află poezia?, Ed. "Arhipelag", 1996 (eseuri);
Paradigma poeziei moderne, Ed. "Leka Brâncuş", 1996, ed. a II-a, Ed. "Aula", 2004 (eseu). Porneşte de la teza sa de doctorat;
Eseu asupra poeziei moderne, Ed. "Cartier", 1997 (eseu);
Sinapse, Ed. "Aula", 2001 (eseuri);
Supravieţuirea prin ficţiune, Ed. "Aula", 2005 (eseuri);
Antropologie culturală şi folclor

References 

Romanian male poets
Romanian essayists
Romanian editors
1954 births
University of Bucharest alumni
2013 deaths
People from Sibiu
20th-century Romanian poets
Male essayists
20th-century essayists
20th-century Romanian male writers